Osbern is a given name. Variants include Osbearn and Osbarn.

Notable people with the name include:

Osbeorn Bulax (died 1054), son of Siward of Northumbria
Osbern the Steward  Osbern de Crépon (died c. 1040), steward and seneschal of two Norman dukes
Osbern Pentecost (d.1054) pre conquest Norman knight in England and Scotland
Osbern FitzOsbern a.k.a. Osbern of Exeter (died 1103), Bishop of Exeter, Osbern the Steward's son and William FitzOsbern's brother
Osbern of Canterbury (died 1090), English Benedictine monk
Osbern of Westminster a.k.a. Osbert of Clare (died c. 1158), English Benedictine monk, abbot and author
Osbern of Gloucester (died 1200), English Benedictine monk and hagiographer
Osbern Bokenam (died c. 1447), English poet 
Osbern FitzRichard, Anglo-Norman baron, Richard FitzScrope's son
Osbern FitzHugh, descendant of Richard FitzScrope's family

See also 
 Osborn (surname)
 Osborne (name)
 Osbourne (disambiguation)